Casal de São Simão is a small village in the municipality Figueiró dos Vinhos, Portugal.

External links
 Municipality official website
 Website Casal de São Simão
 Slideshow Casal de São Simão

Villages in Portugal